Leo Einer Johnson (June 12, 1901 – March 6, 1976) was a Canadian curler. He was the skip of the 1934 Brier Champion team, representing Manitoba.

References

Brier champions
1901 births
1976 deaths
Curlers from Winnipeg
Canadian people of Icelandic descent 
Canadian male curlers